The South American Mountain Running Championships (Spanish: Campeonatos Sudamericanos de Carreras de Montaña) is an annual Mountain running competition organized by CONSUDATLE for athletes representing the countries of its member associations.  The event was established in 2006.

Editions

Results
Complete results were published.

See also
World Mountain Running Championships
European Mountain Running Championships
NACAC Mountain Running Championships
World Long Distance Mountain Running Championships
Commonwealth Mountain and Ultradistance Running Championships

References

Continental athletics championships
Mountain running competitions
Recurring sporting events established in 2006
Mountain running